Tuotilo (died 27 April 915) was a Frankish monk at the Abbey of Saint Gall. He was a composer, and according to Ekkehard IV a century later, also a poet, musician, painter and sculptor. Various trope melodies can be assigned to Tuotilo, but works of other mediums are attributed with less certainty.

Life and career

Born in Alemannic Germany, he is said to have been a large and powerfully built man, and an excellent boxer. Always cheerful and in excellent spirits, he was a general favorite. He was the friend of Notker of St. Gall, with whom he studied music under Moengal. Educated at the Abbey of St. Gall, he remained to become a monk there.

Tuotilo was a composer, poet, musician, painter and sculptor.

According to the British librarian John W Bradley, Tuotilo was said to be "a good speaker, had a fine musical voice, was a capital carver in wood, and an accomplished illuminator. Like most of the earlier monks of St. Gall, he was a clever musician, equally skillful with the trumpet and the harp. Besides being teacher of music in the upper school to the sons of the nobility, he was a classical tutor and could preach both in Latin and Greek. His chief accomplishments, however, were music and painting, and on these his reputation mainly rests. He was much in request and by the permission of his abbot travelled to distant places. One of his celebrated sculptures was the image of the Blessed Virgin for the cathedral at Metz. In addition, he was a mathematician and astronomer, and constructed an astrolabe or orrery, which showed the courses of the planets".

Works

Music

Tuotilo played several instruments, including the harp. The history of the ecclesiastical drama begins with the trope sung as Introit of the Mass on Easter Sunday. It has come down to us in a St. Gallen manuscript dating from the time of Tuotilo. According to the works catalogue of Ekkehard IV, Casus sancti Galli, Tuotilo is the author of five tropes; further research ascribed five additional tropes to him. Some of them are available in modern editions.

Art
James Midgley Clark points out that the most interesting items at the St. Gallen Abbey in Switzerland are the ivory tablets attributed to Tuotilo, which form the cover of the Evangelium Longum. Tuotilo's paintings can be found at Konstanz, Metz, St. Gallen, and Mainz.

Legacy
Tuotilo was buried at a chapel dedicated to Saint Catherine in St. Gall, which was later renamed for him. His feast day is celebrated on 28 March. St. Tuotilo is the patron saint of speech therapists.

References

Notes

Citations

Sources

Further reading
 
 
 

850s births
915 deaths
Year of birth uncertain
Carolingian poets
9th-century composers
10th-century composers
Medieval male composers
10th-century Christian saints
Irish classical composers
Irish male classical composers
German classical composers
German male classical composers
Hymnographers
9th-century Irish poets
10th-century Irish poets
Irish male poets
9th-century German poets
10th-century German poets
German male poets
10th-century German writers
9th-century mathematicians
9th-century astronomers